Kirby College of Further Education, formerly girls-only Kirby Grammar School, is a campus in Linthorpe, Middlesbrough. Founded in 1910 with the benefaction of Alderman Kirby, in its recent history it was part of Middlesbrough College, created via a merger of Kirby and Acklam Sixth Form College. This was further expanded with the inclusion of Teesside Tertiary College in 2002. In summer 2008, the various sites were consolidated onto a single site at Middlehaven.

Current status 

After several years of abandonment, the site has now been bought and is currently under redevelopment as The Old College - a set of residential apartments.

The developer, Green Lane Capital, plans to use the building to create 'upmarket' apartments.

Gallery

References

External links 
 Official site of Middlesbrough College
 The Old College development
 The Evening Gazette article

Education in Middlesbrough
Defunct universities and colleges in England
Buildings and structures in Middlesbrough